Tapioca pudding (similar to sago pudding) is a sweet pudding made with tapioca and either milk or cream. Coconut milk is also used in cases in which the flavour is preferred or in areas in which it is a commonplace ingredient for cooking. It is made in many cultures with equally varying styles, and may be produced in a variety of ways. Its consistency ranges from thin (runny), to thick, to firm enough to eat with a fork.

The pudding can be made from scratch using tapioca in a variety of forms: flakes, coarse meal, sticks, and pearls. Many commercial packaged mixes are also available.

British schoolchildren have traditionally nicknamed the dish frog spawn, due to its appearance. The Guardian described it as "Britain's most hated school pudding", with names such as fish eyes, frogspawn and eyeball pudding. It is however making a comeback in the 21st century in Michelin-starred restaurants and less exalted places. In southern India a type of dessert pudding known as jawhuarusee payasam made from tapioca pearls is made during festival times.

Tapioca pudding was one of the dishes that Rhode Island army officers ate for their Fourth of July celebrations during the siege of Petersburg.

See also

 Congee
 Sago pudding
 Rice pudding
 Semolina pudding
 Helmipuuro
 Sago soup
 Mango pomelo sago
 List of African dishes

References

Puddings
Vietnamese cuisine
Ghanaian cuisine
South African cuisine
Cassava dishes
Independence Day (United States) foods
American desserts
British puddings
Milk dishes